Elzaphan McConnell "Zip" Hanna (December 1, 1916 – January 18, 2001) was an American football guard in the National Football League for the Washington Redskins, wearing jersey #39. Hanna attended Chester High School in Chester, South Carolina as well as Gaffney High School in Gaffney, SC. Hanna was invited to play in the first S.C.-N.C. Shrine Bowl, but rejected the invitation as Gaffney was playing for the Southeastern Football Championship. He played college football at the University of South Carolina, and served in the United States Navy during World War II prior to joining the Redskins. In 1946, suffering from knee injuries, he became a player-coach of the Charlotte Clippers semi-pro team. 

In the latter part of 1946, he became chief of police in Rock Hill, South Carolina. In 1955, he accepted the position of chief of police in Aiken, SC, from which he retired. After retiring, he moved to the Piedmont area and formed a home builders group. Hanna died in January 2001 at the VA Hospital in Asheville, North Carolina.

References

1916 births
2001 deaths
American football offensive guards
People from Chester, South Carolina
South Carolina Gamecocks football players
Washington Redskins players
People from Rock Hill, South Carolina
United States Navy personnel of World War II